Centre for Strategic Studies of NAJA is a think tank and strategic studies research institute affiliated with the Law Enforcement Force of Islamic Republic of Iran. It was directed by Brigadier General Ahmad-Reza Radan.

References

External links 
 Website

Research institutes in Iran
Think tanks based in Iran
Law enforcement in Iran
Criminal justice think tanks
Legal think tanks